Nicholas Sookdeosingh (born 23 July 1989) is a Trinidadian cricketer who has played for the Trinidad and Tobago national team in West Indian domestic cricket.

Sookdeosingh made his List A debut for Trinidad and Tobago in the 2014–15 Regional Super50, against the West Indies under-19s. Opening the batting with Evin Lewis on debut, he scored 35 from 35 balls. In his other matches in the competition, Sookdeosingh scored 19 against Jamaica, and was out for a two-ball duck against the Leeward Islands.

References

External links
Player profile and statistics at CricketArchive
Player profile and statistics at ESPNcricinfo

1989 births
Living people
Trinidad and Tobago cricketers
Trinidad and Tobago representative cricketers